Louisiana Krewe FC is an American soccer team based in Lafayette, Louisiana and competes within USL League Two. As members of the Gulf Coast Premier League, the team earned national attention when it qualified for the 2020 U.S. Open Cup in its first season of eligibility prior to the tournament's cancelation.

History
Krewe FC was founded in late 2018 as an adult team extension of the Louisiana Dynamo Jrs youth organization in Lafayette. As an amateur affiliate of the Houston Dynamo of Major League Soccer, the club hopes to provide "Louisiana players exceptional playing and training opportunities" through the connection to professional soccer.

On October 27, 2021, the Krewe were announced as a new expansion team in USL League Two.

Competitions

U.S. Open Cup
After reaching the GCPL semifinal in its first season, the team entered the 2020 U.S. Open Cup qualification tournament and defeated fellow league side Northshore United, 5–2, in the first round. Krewe then defeated Athletic Katy FC of the United Premier Soccer League in the second round, 3–2, off an 88th minute game-winner by forward Henrique Pimpao. In the final round of qualifying, the team defeated Michigan side Livonia City FC, 1–0, and became the second Open Division local team to qualify from the state of Louisiana (Motagua New Orleans qualified in 2016).

U.S. Soccer announced on January 22 that the Krewe would host USL League Two side Corpus Christi FC in the First Round on March 22. However, the tournament was later suspended and eventually cancelled due to the COVID-19 pandemic.

Despite tournament organizers announcing every qualified team from the 2020 tournament would be re-invited to the 2021 edition (so long as they stay eligible) only two open division teams were invited in this new format. In a random draw on April 7, 2021, the Krewe were not selected for the tournament (which was also eventually cancelled).

NISA Independent Cup
On July 1, 2020, the National Independent Soccer Association announced the NISA Independent Cup, a regionalized competition featuring its own members alongside independent professional and amateur clubs, with the Krewe taking part in the Central Plains Region. In the semifinal series against fellow GCPL member Gaffa FC, played at Holden Stadium on the campus of Pearl River Community College in Poplarville, Mississippi, the Krewe lost the first leg, 1–0, before coming from behind to tie the aggregate in the second leg, 3–2. In the penalty kick shootout, Gaffa advanced after ten rounds, 9–8.

On May 25, 2021, the second edition of the Independent Cup was announced with the Krewe once again taking part in the expanded field. The squad went undefeated in the South Central Region (2-1-0) and took home the title following a win over fellow GCPL side Alexandria PBFC.

Year-by-year

USL League Two

Gulf Coast Premier League

Honors
Gulf Coast Premier League
GCPL Cup
Champion (1): 2021
Western Conference
Champion (1): 2021
Fall Tournament Showcase
Champion (1): 2020

NISA Independent Cup
South Central Region
Champion (1): 2021
Central Plains Region
Semifinalist (1): 2020

U.S. Open Cup
Qualified: 2020

References

External links
 

Association football clubs established in 2018
Gulf Coast Premier League
USL League Two teams
Soccer in Louisiana
Sports teams in Lafayette, Louisiana
2018 establishments in Louisiana